DXOM (963 AM) Radyo Bida is a radio station owned and operated by the Notre Dame Broadcasting Corporation. The station's studio is located at the NDBC Bldg., General Santos Dr., Koronadal, while its transmitter is located at Roxas Mountain Range, Brgy. Paraiso, Koronadal. It operates daily from 4:00 AM to 9:30 PM.

References

News and talk radio stations in the Philippines
Radio stations established in 2014
Radio stations in South Cotabato